Deseado Lake is a lake located on the main island of the  Tierra del Fuego archipelago. The lake has an east–west orientation and is bounded by mountains to the north and south. Most of the lake lies in Chile while the eastern end lies in Argentina. The lake lies in Lago Deseado Fault Zone.

References

Lakes of Argentina
Lakes of Chile
Isla Grande de Tierra del Fuego
Lakes of Magallanes Region
Argentina–Chile border
International lakes of South America
Lakes of Tierra del Fuego Province, Argentina